Chevannah Paalvast (born 4 September 1991) is a professional basketball player from New Zealand.

Professional career

College
Paalvast played college basketball for the Monmouth Hawks in West Long Branch, New Jersey, participating in NCAA Division I.  In her final season, she was awarded a place on the All-MAAC Third Team.

Monmouth statistics

Source

Australia
After a season with the Southern Peninsula Sharks in the Big V, Paalvast was signed by the WNBL defending champions, the Townsville Fire for the 2015–16 season. She would go on to take home her maiden WNBL title and help the Fire achieve back-to-back titles. Paalvast has been re-signed for the 2016–17 season. 

In September 2017, Paalvast was signed by the Canberra Capitals for the 2017–18 season.

National team
At the 2015 FIBA Oceania Women's Championship Paalvast made her international debut where she won a silver medal as part of the Tall Ferns New Zealand women's basketball team. She represented New Zealand at FIBA Olympic Qualifying Tournament 2016. Unfortunately, the Tall Ferns fell short on Olympic qualification.

References

1991 births
Living people
Basketball players at the 2018 Commonwealth Games
Commonwealth Games bronze medallists for New Zealand
Commonwealth Games medallists in basketball
Guards (basketball)
Monmouth Hawks women's basketball players
New Zealand expatriate basketball people in the United States
New Zealand women's basketball players
Sportspeople from the Auckland Region
Townsville Fire players
Medallists at the 2018 Commonwealth Games